Inniu (Irish: Today) was an Irish-language newspaper, published in Dublin, Ireland, from 17 March 1943 until 24 August 1984 when it was merged with the Galway-based publication Amárach to form a new weekly newspaper Anois, which started in September 1984.

History
Initially the paper was a monthly publication but in April 1945 it changed to a weekly paper. The paper had offices on Merrion Square in Dublin and later in O'Connell Street. The paper was founded by Ciarán Ó Nualláin (who had worked for the Irish Independent and was the brother of Flann O'Brien) and Proinsias Mac an Bheatha who were disaffected with Conradh na Gaeilge and had formed a grouping called Glúin na Bua (Ulster spelling: Glún na Buaidhe).

Ciaran Ó Nualláin (1910-1983) remained as editor from its foundation until 1979, when he was succeeded by the assistant editor, Tarlach Ó hUid (1917-1990).

The loss of Irish Government financial support due to rationalisation led to the demise of the paper.

See also
Aiséirí

References

1943 establishments in Ireland
1984 disestablishments in Ireland
Defunct newspapers published in Ireland
Irish-language newspapers
Newspapers published in Ireland
Newspapers established in 1943
Publications disestablished in 1984